Lisewo Małe  is a village in the administrative district of Gmina Gozdowo, within Sierpc County, Masovian Voivodeship, in east-central Poland.

Notable people
Notable people associated with Lisewo Małe include:
Czesław Kaczmarek (1895-1963), bishop of Kielce 1938–1963

References

Villages in Sierpc County